Peter Nicholas Biddle (born December 22, 1966) is a software evangelist from the United States. His primary fields of interest include content distribution, secure computing, and encryption.

Career
Biddle joined Microsoft in 1990 as a Support Engineer. He was one of the first authors to describe the concept of darknet,. an early participant in the Secure Digital Music Initiative (SDMI), Copy Protection Technical Working Group, and Trusted Computing Platform Alliance, an early technical evangelist for DVD and digital video recorder technology, the founding leader of Microsoft's Next-Generation Secure Computing Base (code named Palladium) initiative, and was responsible for starting Microsoft's Hypervisor development efforts.

Biddle built and led the engineering team that shipped BitLocker Drive Encryption, a Trusted Platform Module-rooted disk encryption for Windows Vista. Bitlocker continues to be used by Microsoft today, having been shipped with certain versions of Windows 7 Ultimate, Windows 8, Windows 8.1 and Windows Server 2008 and later.

In 1998, Biddle publicly demonstrated real-time consumer digital video recorder functionality using an inexpensive MPEG2 hardware  encoder, at the WinHEC conference during a speech by Bill Gates.  Biddle was the author of the diagram on page 13 in the SDMI specification, which enabled the playback of unknown or unlicensed content on SDMI-compliant players, and was a vocal proponent within SDMI for the external validation of digital watermarking.

On August 8, 2007, London-based company Trampoline Systems, a company exploring what they called The Enterprise 2.0 space announced Biddle would be moving to London to join them as Vice President of Development after leaving Microsoft. While at Trampoline, Biddle ran all product development and engineering efforts.

In 2008, Biddle joined Intel Corporation as a director of the Google program office. During his tenure at Intel, he also served in other positions, including evangelist and General Manager of Intel's AppUp digital storefront, which was shuttered in 2014 after four years' operation, Director of the Intel Atom Developer Program, described as "...a framework for developers to create and sell software applications for netbooks with support for handhelds and smart phones available in the future", and General Manager of Intel's Cloud Services Platform.

In 2009 he became a surprise witness in the RealNetworks, Inc. v. DVD Copy Control Association, Inc. case where, as one of the drafters of the CSS license, he served as an expert on certain CSS licensing issues at the heart of the case.

For more than 3 years during Biddle's tenure at Intel, he hosted the podcast "MashUp Radio", an online publication sponsored by Intel.

In 2014, Biddle founded TradLabs, a company using technology to make rock climbing safer and more accessible.

Personal life
Biddle is a member of the Biddle family of Philadelphia and is a descendant of Nicholas Biddle, whose name he bears as his middle name. Other notable Biddles include Charles Biddle, Vice President of Pennsylvania and Mary Duke Biddle Trent Semans an American heiress and philanthropist.

External links
  Plucky rebels: Being agile in an un-agile place - Peter Biddle at TED@Intel
 Mobile Insights Radio with Peter Biddle
 Twit.tv - This week in Law 213
 The Darknet & the Future of Everything* - Keynote Address Gov 2.0 L.A.
 Tradlabs

References

1966 births
Living people
Peter
Microsoft employees
Microsoft Windows people